Avanhard is an urban-type settlement in Odesa Raion of Odesa Oblast in Ukraine. It is a western suburb of the city of Odesa and is adjacent to the city. Avanhard hosts the administration of Avanhard settlement hromada, one of the hromadas of Ukraine. Population: 

Until 18 July 2020, Avanhard belonged to Ovidiopol Raion. The raion was abolished in July 2020 as part of the administrative reform of Ukraine, which reduced the number of raions of Odesa Oblast to seven. The area of Ovidiopol Raion was split between Bilhorod-Dnistrovskyi and Odesa Raions, with Avanhard being transferred to Odesa Raion.

Economy

Transportation
The closest railway station, located in Odesa, is Novodepovska. It is on the railway line which connects Odesa via Rozdilna and Podilsk with Vinnytsia. There is some passenger traffic.

The settlement is included into Odesa road network.

References

Urban-type settlements in Odesa Raion